Charles Debriel Kilbury (February 2, 1919 – January 17, 2005) was an American politician in the state of Washington. He served in the Washington House of Representatives from 1970 to 1979.

References

2005 deaths
1919 births
Politicians from Yakima, Washington
Democratic Party members of the Washington House of Representatives
20th-century American politicians